Jane Kamensky, an American historian, is a professor of history at Harvard University. She is also the Carl and Lily Pforzheimer Foundation Director of the Schlesinger Library.

Kamensky graduated from Yale University in 1985 with a B.A., and in 1993 with a Ph.D. in history. She was a Radcliffe Institute Fellow in 2006–2007. She married Dennis J. Scannell Jr. in 1987; they live in Cambridge, Massachusetts with their two sons.

Awards and honors
1987 Mellon Fellow
2009 George Washington Book Prize finalist
2009 Fellow, Society of American Historians
2016 Barbara and David Zalaznick Book Prize in American History for A Revolution in Color: The World of John Singleton Copley
 2018 Guggenheim Fellow

Works
 A Revolution in Color: The World of John Singleton Copley, W. W. Norton. 2016. .

References

External links

21st-century American historians
Yale University alumni
Harvard University faculty
Living people
People from Cambridge, Massachusetts
Year of birth missing (living people)
American women historians
Radcliffe fellows
Historians from Massachusetts
21st-century American women writers